Borommaratchachonnani is a Thai title meaning "royal mother".

Persons who held the title include:
Saovabha Phongsri, the Queen Mother Sri Bajrindra
Sirikit, the Queen Mother
Srinagarindra, the Princess Mother

Borommaratchachonnani may also refer to:
Borommaratchachonnani Road
Boromarajonani College of Nursing